Dongling Lake is a lake in the Qarhan Playa north of Golmud in the Haixi Prefecture of Qinghai Province in northwestern China. Like the other lakes of the surrounding Qaidam Basin, it is extremely saline.

Geography 
Its depth does not usually exceed .

Dongling's position at the northern end of the playa means that its waters are far more influenced by the mineral springs and their high concentrations of solutes.

See also 
 Qarhan Playa & Qaidam Basin
 List of lakes and saltwater lakes of China

Notes

References

Citations

Bibliography 
 .
 .
 .
 .

Lakes of China
Lakes of Qinghai
Haixi Mongol and Tibetan Autonomous Prefecture